Frank Lewis (December 6, 1912 – August 16, 1998) was an American wrestler and olympic champion. He competed at the 1936 Olympic Games in Berlin, where he received a gold medal in freestyle welterweight. 

Franklin was born in Coleman, Texas and raised in Cushing, Oklahoma. In high school, he won an Oklahoma wrestling state championship in 1929. He wrestling collegiately at Oklahoma State (then called Oklahoma A&M). Lewis was an NCAA runner-up in 1934 and the NCAA champion in 1935 at 155 pounds, while also being named Most Outstanding Wrestler of the event. Following college, he earned a sport on the U.S. Olympic Freestyle Wrestling team, winning a gold medal in the welterweight division at the 1936 Olympic Games.

In 1979, Lewis was inducted in the National Wrestling Hall of Fame as a Distinguished Member.

References

1912 births
1998 deaths
Wrestlers at the 1936 Summer Olympics
American male sport wrestlers
Olympic gold medalists for the United States in wrestling
Medalists at the 1936 Summer Olympics
20th-century American people